The Khurmana River is a river in Pakistan.  It is a tributary of the Kurram River.

References

Rivers of Khyber Pakhtunkhwa
Rivers of Pakistan